Three Kings, created by band Dead Meadow, was a joint live-music release coupled with a live-action DVD that strings together clips of concert performances with mixed psychedelic scenes. The live-music release is a mix of previous studio recordings played live coupled with five new-release songs. The combination was performed at their hometown, at the conclusion of a five-month tour to support Old Growth, their prior album.

DVD

The DVD's base setting consists three mystics "kings" are swept into an alternate reality where they are tempted by various dark sides of humanity, with different reactions from each. This is coupled with various psychedelic scenes, usually paired with the more upbeat, jammier, songs. There is no specific theme to these scenes. One example consists of bipedal "weed-creatures" self-igniting, with the resulting smoke inhaled by the moon. Locations used include the Tatooine set from within Star Wars and residences from Diamonds Are Forever.

Track listing

Critical Reception
Reviews of Three Kings varied between slightly and generally positive on both the music and the accompanying DVD.

AllMusic felt the music, including the newer songs, were good but not notably enhanced by their live performance as opposed to their standard studio albums, which are already played in a "loose and live fashion". However, the DVD was described as an "engaging visual experience".

Exclaim! gave a positive report on the live music, describing it as spectacular and akin to a Jimi Hendrix jam session, although functionally mute on the visual aspect of the release.

Pitchfork's review was more mixed, both towards the live-music release and the visuals DVD. The live-performance nature was not felt to add anything, indeed, to reduce the urgency of the otherwise high quality music. The DVD was alternatively described as bizarre, humorous and as having some potential parallels to Dead Meadow's own music.

References

Dead Meadow albums
2010 albums
Xemu Records albums